Kot Ladha is a small town in Gujranwala district of Punjab, Pakistan. It is situated on Gujranwala to Hafizabad road.

Geography
Kot Ladha is located in west of district Gujranwala, on Gujranwala Hafizabad road.

Education

There are many Public and Private institutes are serving in village. Education system is modern but literacy rate is very low. Literacy rate is about 58%.

Health system
There is a  Rural Health Centre Kot Ladha, province health facilities. There are some private hospitals and doctors working their best.

Nearby villages
 Badoki Saikhwan
 Chabba Sindhwan
 Dera Shah Jamal
 Nokhar
Ram garh
Qila majha singh

See also
 Badoki Saikhwan
 Nokhar
 Chabba Sindhwan
 Gujranwala

References

Cities and towns in Gujranwala District